Henri Fabergé and the Adorables are a Canadian indie rock band formed in 2005 from Toronto, Ontario, Canada.

History
Henri Fabergé and the Adorables formed in 2005 and is a musical collective including members of The Bicycles, Born Ruffians, Spitfires & Mayflowers, Woodhands, The Rural Alberta Advantage and The Meligrove Band, the Adorables most commonly consist of Henri Fabergé (Henry Fletcher), Juliann Wilding, Janderton Beauregard (Andy Lloyd), Maylee Todd, Dana Snell, Laura Barrett, Dan Werb, and Johnny Ortved. Past and occasional members include Niall Fynes, Keith Hamilton, Tom MacCammon, Luke LaLonde, Mitch DeRosier, Steve Hamelin, Andrew Scott, Brendan Howlett, Ruhee Dewji, Kelly Sue O'Connor (Mal de Mer)(Proof of Ghosts), Peter Thorne, Sara Jane McKenzie, Matt Beckett, Drew Smith, Randy Lee and Paul Banwatt.

The band released its self-titled debut album in 2006. The album was recorded by Ryan Mills at Sleepytown Sound, in Henri's living room and at The Embassy bar in Kensington Market.
From 2005 until 2008, the Adorables held a residency at The Embassy in Kensington Market occurring the first Wednesday of every month. These shows became local folklore and were one of the best parties in Toronto at the time. Many Canadian bands played early shows at these events, namely: Born Ruffians, Woodhands (their 2nd show with Paul Banwatt), Maylee Todd, The Rural Alberta Advantage, and DD/MM/YYYY.

The R3-30
The single "Ventriloquist Love" reached the No. 1 spot on CBC Radio 3's The R3-30 chart on January 4, 2007, and was named one of the network's Top 94 Tracks of 2006.

The R3-30 in that era traditionally announced each week's biggest chart dropper with a descending slide whistle tone. After "Ventriloquist Love" dropped from No. 9 to No. 19 the week of January 19, 2007, resulting in use of the slide whistle, the band humorously criticized R3-30 host Craig Norris' musical abilities, challenging him to record a whole song on slide whistle. After Norris published a lighthearted apology on the CBC Radio 3 site, Fabergé subsequently released an audio retort which included three short sarcastic songs about Norris by Maylee Todd, Dan Werb and Fabergé himself.

Members

Current
Laura Barrett
Janderton Beauregard
Henri Fabergé
Johnny Ortved
Dana Snell
Maylee Todd
Dan Werb
Juliann Wilding

Former
Paul Banwatt
Matt Beckett
Mitch DeRosier
Ruhee Dewji
Niall Fynes
Steve Hamelin
Keith Hamilton
Brendan Howlett
Chris Kettlewell
Luke LaLonde
Randy Lee
Sara Jane McKenzie
Kelly Sue O'Connor
Andrew Scott
Drew Smith
Peter Thorne
Tom MacCammon

Discography
Henri Fabergé and the Adorables (2006)

See also

Music of Canada
Canadian rock
List of Canadian musicians
List of bands from Canada
:Category:Canadian musical groups

References

External links
Henri Fabergé and the Adorables

Musical groups established in 2005
Canadian indie rock groups
Musical collectives
Musical groups from Toronto
2005 establishments in Ontario